Steven Knapp is an American academic who served as the 16th President of the George Washington University, in Washington, DC, succeeding Stephen Joel Trachtenberg. He currently serves on the boards of the World Affairs Council, the Economic Club of Washington, DC, the U.S. Council on Competitiveness, and the National Symphony Orchestra, as well as serving as a fellow of the Council on Foreign Relations and the Modern Language Association.

Prior to GW, Knapp served as the dean of Johns Hopkins University's School of Arts and Sciences. On June 7, 2016, Knapp announced that he would not seek a third term as University President, and therefore would be concluding his tenure as in July 2017.

Early life
Knapp grew up in Westwood, New Jersey. He is a 1973 graduate of Yale University with a Bachelor of Arts degree. He did his graduate work at Cornell University, earning a master's degree in 1977 and his doctorate in 1981.

A specialist in Romanticism, literary theory, and the relation of literature to philosophy and religion, Knapp taught English literature at the University of California, Berkeley before serving at the Johns Hopkins University.

Knapp was the provost (1996–2007) and then Dean of the School of Arts and Sciences (1994–1996) at Johns Hopkins University.

Knapp presidency
Knapp's priorities include enhancing the university's partnerships with neighboring institutions, expanding the scope of its research, strengthening its worldwide community of alumni, enlarging its students' opportunities for public service, and leading its transformation into a model of urban sustainability.

During Knapp's tenure, the university constructed District House, a large residence hall and the Science and Engineering Hall, both located on the Foggy Bottom campus.  The Science and Engineering Hall is the largest academic and laboratory building in the nation's capital.  Under Knapp, the $1 Billion "Making History: The Campaign for GW" fundraising initiative was successfully completed. Knapp declined to seek a third term as university president and stepped down in November 2017. He continues to teach at the school today.

Board and leadership positions
Knapp serves on the boards of directors of the Economic Club of Washington; the Greater Washington Urban League; the World Affairs Council; and the National Symphony Orchestra and the boards of trustees of the Washington National Cathedral Foundation and Al Akhawayn University in Ifrane, Morocco. He also serves on the senior advisory board of the Northern Virginia Technology Council, the executive committee of the Council on Competitiveness, and the education committee of the Federal City Council.

He is a fellow of the American Academy of Arts and Sciences, a member of the Council on Foreign Relations, and a member of the Modern Language Association.

References

External links
 About President Steven Knapp

Presidents of George Washington University
Johns Hopkins University faculty
Living people
Yale University alumni
Cornell University alumni
Fellows of the American Academy of Arts and Sciences
People from Walnut Creek, California
People from Westwood, New Jersey
George Washington University faculty
Year of birth missing (living people)